Dormitator is a genus of fishes in the family Eleotridae mostly found in marine, fresh and brackish waters on either side of the Atlantic Ocean, with one species occurring along the Pacific coast of the Americas.

Species
There are currently 5 recognized species in this genus:
 Dormitator cubanus Ginsburg, 1953
 Dormitator latifrons (J. Richardson, 1844) (Pacific fat sleeper)
 Dormitator lebretonis (Steindachner, 1870)
 Dormitator lophocephalus Hoedeman, 1951
 Dormitator maculatus (Bloch, 1792) (Fat sleeper)

References

 
Marine fish genera